is a former Japanese biathlete. He was one of the top male Japanese biathletes from 2000 until his retirement in 2014.

Career
Born in the city of Ojiya in the Niigata Prefecture, Isa found biathlon after graduating high school and joining the military. Isa debuted in the World Cup in first round of the 2000–01 World Cup in Antholz-Anterselva, Italy. That season Isa made his debut at the World Championships at the World Championships in Pokljuka. He also participated in all World Championships from 2003 to 2009, and then all three World Championships from 2011 to 2013 for Japan. Isa participated in his first Olympics in 2002 and he also participated in the Olympics in 2006, 2010 and 2014. His best individual finish at the Olympics came in the 12.5 km pursuit in 2006, he finished 35th. His best relay finish also came in 2006, a 12th place. His best individual finish at the World Championships came in 2005 in Hochfilzen, where Isa finished 25th in the pursuit. His best relay finish at the World Championships was an 11th which came in 2001 in Pokljuka.

Through his career, Isa never finished on the podium, but he once finished in the top ten individually. It, a 10th place, came in Pokljuka in the third round of the 2009–10 season. Isa's best relay finish in the World Cup was an 8th in Ruhpolding in 2004. His best overall finish came in the 2001–02 World Cup where he finished 46th.

After the 20 km individual race at the 2014 Olympics, Isa announced his retirement from the sport.

Biathlon results
All results are sourced from the International Biathlon Union.

Olympic Games

*Mass start was added as an event in 2006, with the mixed relay being added in 2014.

World Championships

*During Olympic seasons competitions are only held for those events not included in the Olympic program.
**Mixed relay was added as an event in 2005.

References

External links
 

1976 births
Living people
Sportspeople from Niigata Prefecture
Japanese male biathletes
Biathletes at the 2002 Winter Olympics
Biathletes at the 2006 Winter Olympics
Biathletes at the 2010 Winter Olympics
Biathletes at the 2014 Winter Olympics
Olympic biathletes of Japan
Asian Games medalists in biathlon
Biathletes at the 1999 Asian Winter Games
Biathletes at the 2007 Asian Winter Games
Biathletes at the 2011 Asian Winter Games
Asian Games gold medalists for Japan
Asian Games silver medalists for Japan
Asian Games bronze medalists for Japan
Medalists at the 1999 Asian Winter Games
Medalists at the 2007 Asian Winter Games
Medalists at the 2011 Asian Winter Games